Lordswood is a southern suburb of Chatham, Kent, located approximately 3 miles south of Chatham town centre. It is primarily in Medway but a small southern section is in the Borough of Maidstone. Lordswood possesses pockets of woodland, a high street and a health centre, with good access routes to the motorway.

Sport and leisure 
Lordswood has a Non-League football club Lordswood F.C., which play at Martyn Grove.

Lordswood leisure centre is located close to The Martyn Grove woodland and has a function suite named after the area.

References

External links 
 Lordswood Leisure Centre
 Lordswood Library

Medway